The South Dakota Symphony Orchestra (SDSO) is an American orchestra located in Sioux Falls, South Dakota and is a member of the League of American Orchestras.  Approximately 90 musicians make up the orchestra, varying from professionals to semiprofessionals.  A typical season consists of several touring performances as well as ten concerts with full orchestra, five chamber concerts, and two special event performances.  Concerts are held in the Washington Pavilion of Arts and Science in downtown Sioux Falls.  The SDSO official song is "Alleluias for Orchestra" written by South Dakota composer Stephen Yarbrough.  In 2007 the endowment for the SDSO was 2.2 million dollars a growth of 28 times since 1998.

History and reception
The orchestra was founded in 1922  at Augustana College.  Conductor and music director Delta David Gier has been with the SDSO since the 2004-2005 season, and is also an assistant conductor for the New York Philharmonic.  Michael Manley of the American Symphony Orchestra League said of the SDSO, "...from its visionary music director to its passionate musicians, from its active and dedicated donors and board to its devoted and tireless staff—the South Dakota Symphony is one of those unexpected masterpieces you happen upon, whose impact manages to encompass the world. Since the 2004-2005 season Pulitzer prize-winning composers Paul Moravec and Steven Stucky have had residencies and given concerts with the orchestra.  The SDSO was selected as one of two hosts for a week long residency by Japanese violin virtuoso Midori for the 2007-2008 season.

In 2022, The New Yorker featured the South Dakota Symphony Orchestra, describing it as among the nations "boldest orchestras".

Following a major donation, the orchestra announced plans to revive Pulitzer Prize winning opera Giants in the Earth (opera), which has been scarcely performed live and is currently inaccessible to the general public.

Leadership
As of the 2019 - 2020 season

Scott Lawrence, President
James Moore, Past President
Allison Suttle, Vice President
Jack Marsh, Secretary
Lisa Gerner, Treasurer
Jennifer Teisinger, Executive Director
Delta David Gier, Music Director

See also
Music of South Dakota

References

External links
SDSO official site

Music of South Dakota
American orchestras
Wikipedia requested audio of orchestras
Performing arts in South Dakota
Sioux Falls, South Dakota
Musical groups established in 1922
1922 establishments in South Dakota